The 1977–78 National Hurling League was the 47th season of the National Hurling League.

Division 1

Clare came into the season as defending champions of the 1976-77 season. Westmeath entered Division 1 as the promoted team.

On 30 April 1978, Clare won the title after a 3-10 to 1-10 win over Kilkenny in the final. It was their third league title overall and their second in succession.

Westmeath were relegated from Division 1 after just one season in the top flight.

Division 1A table

Group stage results

Division 1B table

Group stage results

Play-offs

Knock-out stage
Quarter-finals

Semi-finals

Final

Scoring statistics
Top scorers overall

Miscellaneous
 In Division 1B, Antrim defeated Laois for the first time in a competitive hurling match.

Division 2

On 6 August 1978, Carlow won the title after a 1-15 to 1-7 win over Kerry in the final.

Division 2 table

Knock-out stage
Final

References

National Hurling League seasons
League
League